Vadakkadathukavu is a village in Pathanamthitta district, Kerala, India.

Places of worship
 Vadakkadathukavu Devi Temple

Education
 GVHSS, Vadakkadathukavu

References

Villages in Pathanamthitta district